Spuyten Duyvil may refer to:
Spuyten Duyvil Creek, a channel connecting the Hudson River to the Harlem River Ship Canal, and on to the Harlem River in New York City
Spuyten Duyvil, Bronx, a neighborhood just north of the Creek
Spuyten Duyvil station, a commuter railroad station that serves the residents of the Spuyten Duyvil neighborhood of the Bronx, New York via the Hudson Line
Spuyten Duyvil Bridge, a swing bridge that carries Amtrak's Empire Corridor line across the Spuyten Duyvil Creek between Manhattan and the Bronx, in New York City
December 2013 Spuyten Duyvil derailment, a commuter train accident which occurred near Spuyten Duyvil station
Spuyten Duyvil and Port Morris Railroad, a precursor railway to the New York Central Railroad
USS Spuyten Duyvil, a torpedo boat built in 1864 for service toward the end of the American Civil War